Connor Farrer (born 6 June 1995) is a Welsh professional rugby league footballer who plays as a  for the West Wales Raiders in Betfred League 1 and Wales at international level.

Background
Farrer was born in Pontypridd, Wales.

References

External links
West Wales Raiders profile
South Wales Ironmen profile

1995 births
Living people
Rugby league hookers
Rugby league players from Pontypridd
South Wales Scorpions players
Welsh rugby league players
Wales national rugby league team players